Pedro Martínez and Lorenzo Sonego defeated Tim Pütz and Michael Venus in the final, 5–7, 6–4, [10–8] to win the doubles tennis title at the 2022 Generali Open Kitzbühel.

Alexander Erler and Lucas Miedler were the defending champions, but lost in the first round to Tallon Griekspoor and Bart Stevens.

Seeds

Draw

Draw

References

External links
 Main draw

Generali Open Kitzbühel - Doubles
2022 Doubles